is a passenger railway station located in the town of Kotohira, Kagawa, Japan. It is operated by the private transportation company Takamatsu-Kotohira Electric Railroad (Kotoden) and is designated station "K21".

Lines
Kotoden-Kotohira Station is the southwestern terminus of the Kotoden Kotohira Line and is located 32.9 km from the opposing terminus of the line at Takamatsu-Chikkō Station.

Layout
The station consists of one dead-headed island platform serving two tracks, with the station building located at the end of the platform.

Adjacent stations

History
Kotoden-Kotohira Station opened on March 15, 1927 as Kotohira Station of the Kotohira Electric Railway. It was renamed to its present name in 1942. On November 1, 1943 it became  a station on the Takamatsu Kotohira Electric Railway Kotohira Line due to a company merger. The current station building was completed in 1988.

Surrounding area
Kotohira-gū
Kotohira Station

Passenger statistics

See also
 List of railway stations in Japan

References

External links

  

Railway stations in Japan opened in 1927
Railway stations in Kagawa Prefecture
Kotohira, Kagawa